The 2012–13 Nemzeti Bajnokság I was the sixty-second edition of the top level championship in the Hungarian team handball for women. The regular season began on 31 August 2012 and concluded on 31 March 2013, followed by the classification rounds and the playoff finals.

Defending champions Győri ETO KC won the regular season with an almost perfect performance: 21 victories on 22 games and only one draw against their rival Ferencvárosi TC, last season's runners-up. This year's final also confronted Győr to Ferencváros, after both teams had easily won their semi-finals against Váci NKSE and Érd NK. Unlike last season's final, Ferencváros did not challenge the eventual champion as Győr won both legs by six and seventeen goals and so became Hungarian champion for the tenth time.

Overview

Teams
This year, twelve teams competed in the championship: eleven clubs from the past season and only one promoted team from the second division, Budapest SE, the winner of the Eastern group. It was the first time that this club had played in the elite. As per the previous edition, the winner of the Western group, Mohácsi TE announced that they didn't want to be promoted. As a result, last season's eleventh placed Kiskunhalas NKSE escaped relegation and stayed in the first division.

The league comprised two teams from the capital Budapest (Ferencváros and BSE); two clubs from Central Hungary (Érd and Vác); two from the Southern Great Plain (Békéscsaba and Kiskunhalas); three from Central Transdanubia (Veszprém, Fehérvár, Dunaújváros) and only one team from Western Transdanubia (Győr) and the Northern Great Plain (DVSC).

As Hungarian champion, Győri Audi ETO KC entered the group phase of the EHF Champions League while EHF Cup Winners' Cup's winner FTC-Rail Cargo Hungaria also reached the Top 16 after beating IUVENTA Michalovce in the qualification round. Third and fourth placed Siófok KC and Érdi VSE played in the EHF Cup. It was the first participation in a European Cup for either team. Finally, the runner-up and the bronze medallist of the Hungarian Cup, Váci NSKE and Békéscsabai ENKSE, competed in the EHF Cup Winners' Cup.

Arenas and locations

Regular season

Results

League table

Individual statistics

Top scorers

Team statistics

Overall
 Most wins – Győri Audi ETO KC (21)
 Fewest wins – Budapest SE (1)
 Most losses – Budapest SE (19)
 Fewest losses – Győri Audi ETO KC (0)
 Most goals scored – FTC-Rail Cargo Hungaria (758)
 Fewest goals scored – Budapest SE (526)
 Most goals conceded – Budapest SE (672)
 Fewest goals conceded – Győri Audi ETO KC (450)
 Best goal difference – Győri Audi ETO KC (+289)
 Worst goal difference – Budapest SE (–146)

Home
 Most wins – Győri Audi ETO KC (11)
 Fewest wins – Budapest SE and DVSC-Fórum (1)
 Most losses – Budapest SE (9)
 Fewest losses – Győri Audi ETO KC (0)
 Most goals scored – FTC-Rail Cargo Hungaria (414)
 Fewest goals scored – Budapest SE and Budapest Bank-Békéscsabai ENKSE (271)
 Most goals conceded – Budapest SE (328)
 Fewest goals conceded – Győri Audi ETO KC (210)

Away
 Most wins – Győri Audi ETO KC (10)
 Fewest wins – Budapest SE and DVSC-Fórum (0)
 Most losses – Budapest SE (10)
 Fewest losses – Győri Audi ETO KC (0)
 Most goals scored – Győri Audi ETO KC (362)
 Fewest goals scored – Veszprém Barabás Duna Takarék KC (254)
 Most goals conceded – DVSC-Fórum (350)
 Fewest goals conceded – Győri Audi ETO KC (240)

Scoring
 Widest winning margin: 19 goals –
 Győri Audi ETO KC 37–18 Siófok KC-Galerius Fürdő (19 January 2013)
 Most goals in a match: 78 goals –
 Siófok KC-Galerius Fürdő 35–43 FTC-Rail Cargo Hungaria (26 January 2013)
 Fewest goals in a match: 39 goals –
 Dunaújvárosi Kohász KA 18–21 Fehérvár KC (1 March 2013)
 Most goals scored by losing team: 35 goals –
 Siófok KC-Galerius Fürdő 35–43 FTC-Rail Cargo Hungaria (26 January 2013)
 Most goals scored in a match by one player: 14 goals – 
 Annamária Bogdanović for Siófok KC-Galerius Fürdő against Váci NKSE (7 November 2012)
 Zsuzsanna Tomori for FTC-Rail Cargo Hungaria against Győri Audi ETO KC (7 November 2012)

Postseason

Classification round 9–12
Teams finishing in bottom four places at the close of the regular season entered a classification round, for which a double round-robin system was used. According to their final position in the regular season, these four teams were awarded bonus points. Ninth placed Siófok got four points, tenth placed Békéscsaba received three points, eleventh placed Debrecen got two points and finally last placed BSE were awarded only one point.

Additional points that were awarded after the final positions in the regular season are indicated in the bonus points column.

Classification round 5–8
Teams finished between fifth and eight place also played a play off round. Similarly to the bottom four Classification Round, these four teams were given points depending on their final placement in the regular season.

Additional points that were awarded after the final positions in the regular season are indicated in bonus points column.

Championship playoff

Bracket

Semi-finals

Győri Audi ETO KC vs. Váci NKSE

Győri Audi ETO KC won series 2–0

FTC-Rail Cargo Hungaria vs. ÉTV-Érdi VSE

FTC-Rail Cargo Hungaria won series 2–0

Third place playoffs

ÉTV-Érdi VSE won series 2–1

Finals

Győri Audi ETO KC won series 2–0

Final standing

See also
List of Hungarian women's handball transfers summer 2012

References

External links
 

Nemzeti Bajnokság I (women's handball)
2012–13 domestic handball leagues
Nemzeti Bajnoksag I Women
2012 in women's handball
2013 in women's handball